Moon Heart (Spanish: El corazón de la luna) is a 2021 Peruvian science fiction drama film directed by Aldo Salvini and starring Haydeé Cáceres. The film tells the story of M, an old homeless woman who one day sees a mechanical angel that will change her life. The film was selected by the Ministry of Culture as the Peruvian entry in the Best International Film at the 95th Academy Awards.

Cast 

 Haydeé Cáceres as M

Production 
The film was entirely produced by the Audiovisual Creation Center of the University of Lima (Crea). The script was given to Gerardo Arias more than five years ago under the title "Perro Negro (Black Dog)".

Release 
The film had its international premiere at the SCI-FI London Film Festival on October 26, 2021, where it received the award for Best Feature Film. The film was commercially released on October 27, 2022 in Peruvian theaters.

Awards 

 Best film at the Sci-Fi London Festival.
 Best Actress for Haydeé Cáceres at the Sydney Science Fiction Film Festival.
 Best actress for Haydeé Cáceres at Fantaspoa, the fantastic film festival in Porto Alegre (Brazil).
 Best Actress for Haydeé Cáceres at the 47th Boston Science Fiction Film Festival.

See also 

 List of submissions to the 95th Academy Awards for Best International Feature Film
 List of Peruvian submissions for the Academy Award for Best International Feature Film

References

External links 
 

2021 films
2021 science fiction films
2021 drama films
Peruvian science fiction drama films
2020s science fiction drama films
2020s Spanish-language films
2020s Peruvian films
Films about poverty
Robot films
Films set in Peru
Films shot in Peru